Nesari is a village in Gadhinglaj Taluka of Kolhapur district in Maharashtra, India. As of 2011, it had a population of 21,000. It is about 20 kilometres from Gadhinglaj, and 30 kilometres from National Highway 48 (NH48).

Geography

Nesari is located near the border of Maharashtra and Karnataka. It has an average elevation of 625 meters, and average temperatures of 19 °C in winter and 26 °C in summer.

Demographics

According to the 2011 India census, Nesari has a population of 19,000 which includes Nesari town as well as extended areas included in the town. Nesari has an average literacy rate of 85% as compared to the national average of 74.9%. The male literacy stands at 84%, and female literacy is 72%. In Nesari, 9% of the population is under 6 years of age.

The language most widely spoken is Marathi with 19,000 people speaking Marathi as their Primary Language.

Historic importance

Prataprao Gujar,  Kudtoji Gujar, was the third royal Senapati of King Shivaji's army, which was probably the most successful guerrilla force in 17th century India. He was given the title of Prataprao (the brave) by King Shivaji in acknowledgement of his bravery in the war against Mirza Jaisingh.

He was a highly gifted aristocratic general, who enjoyed the trust of his king and the loyalty of his troops. He defeated a large mughal army at the famous battle of Salher. Salher is a major battle between mughals and marathas, and the first large-scale pitched battle between the two in open field. The victory of the Marathas at Salher is seen as a definitive turning point in their military prowess vis-a-vis the Mughals. Prataprao Gujar's major drawback was his impulsive emotional nature.

A few months before King Shivaji's coronation in 1674, Prataprao Gujar was sent to deal with the invading force led by the Adilshahi general, Bahalol Khan. The Maratha army surrounded the camp of Bahalol Khan at the place of Nesari. Prataprao's forces defeated and captured the opposing general in the battle. In spite of specific warnings against doing so by King Shivaji, Prataprao released Bahalol Khan along troops and the seized war material, when Bahalol Khan promised not to invade King Shivaji's territories again. Days after his release Bahalol Khan started preparing for a fresh invasion.

When King Shivaji heard of about Prataprao decision, he was incensed and wrote an angry letter to Prataprao refusing him permission to see him until such time, until Bahlol Khan was re-captured. Prataprao realised his mistake and was so upset about what he had done that he now wanted to capture Bahlol Khan at any cost.

One day, he learnt of Bahlol Khan camping nearby. Prataprao decided to make a stand against Balol Khan at Nesari. Prataprao Gujar with 1200 troops versus Khan with 15000. So, Prataprao reasoned that there was no point in taking 1200 men to suicide with him. So, in a fit of anger and overreacting to the letter, he left alone, without asking his cavalry to charge. It was his personal honour at stake, not his army. On seeing their leader head to certain death, 6 other Maratha sardars joined him in the charge, they attacked the enemy camp and were slaughtered. Anandrao and Hansaji Mohite, though, stayed back. It was an impulsive decision and the loss of Prataprao Gujar was a big loss to the Marathas. Anandrao Mohite managed to take the army to safer areas.

King Shivaji's army avenged the death of their general, by defeating Bahlol Khan and looting his jagir (fiefdom) under the leadership of Anandrao and Hambirao Mohite. Hambirrao Mohite became the new Sarnaubat (Commander-in-chief of the Maratha forces).

King Shivaji was deeply grieved on hearing of Pratprao's death. He married his second son, Rajaram, to the daughter of Prataprao Gujar; who was later to be the Empress of the Maratha Empire, Maharani Jankibai.[1] This event has been retold in the form of a Marathi poem "Vedaat Marathe Veer Daudale Saat". The poem is written by famous poet Kusumagraj. This poem has also been sung by Lata Mangeshkar.

On 8 October 2014, DAR Motion Pictures, IME Motion Pictures and Blue Drop Films jointly announced a big budget Marathi feature film based on the famous battle. The film titled 'Saat' is slated for a 2016 release. 'Saat' has been written by Nikhil Mahajan and will be directed by debutante director Ashish Bende. The film will be produced by Arun Rangachari, Vivek Rangachari, Suhrud Godbole and Nikhil Mahajan. The lead character of Prataprao Gujar will be played by Marathi and Hindi National Award-winning actor Atul Kulkarni .

Colleges

1. Chatrapati Shivaji Jr, College. Nesari.
2.Arts and Commerce College, Nesari
3. S.S.Highschool, Nesari
4. S.P.G. High school, Nesari
5. V.K.Chavhan High school, Nesari
6. Progressive English Medium School, Nesari
7.S.S. English Medium, School Nesari
8. ST.Xavier's English medium high school Nesari 9. कुमार विद्यामंदीर नेसरी 10.कन्या विद्यामंदीर नेसरी
11. Roshanbi Shamanji College of Agriculture, Nesari

Civic administration

The civic administration of the village is managed by the Nesari gram panchayat. Th

Economy

The major areas of commerce of Nesari are trading, sugar production, and red chili. Nearby marketing hubs include Goa and Sindhudurg district.

Transportation

Nesari is connected to the various towns of Maharashtra via several state highways and is about 15 km from National Highway 4(NH 4). The nearest airport at Belgaum is 39 km away.

References

Cities and towns in Kolhapur district
Talukas in Maharashtra